John Gregg (died 1431 or after) of London and Guildford, Surrey, was an English politician and grocer.

He was a Member (MP) of the Parliament of England for Guildford in 1417 and May 1421.

References

Year of birth missing
15th-century deaths
English MPs 1417
English MPs May 1421
People from Guildford
Politicians from London